Kushkandar (also Romanized as Kūshkandar, Koshkandar and Kūshk Andar) is a village in Bam Rural District, Bam and Safiabad District, Esfarayen County, North Khorasan Province, Iran. At the 2006 census, its population was 201, in 69 families.

References 

Populated places in Esfarayen County